Trampolene are a Welsh alternative rock band from Swansea. They are Jack Jones (vocals, guitar, spoken word), Wayne Thomas (bass, vocals) and Kyle "Mr" Williams (drums, vocals).

Trampolene's latest single "Money" was released on 19 January 2023.

Trampolene made their second appearance on Sky Sports Soccer AM on 26 November 2022.

The first single, "Thinking Again" from their forthcoming album "Rules of Love and War" was released for streaming and download on 13 October 2022 and is included in the soundtrack to videogame NBA 2K23

In October 2022, Trampolene were main support for The Libertines at five shows on their European tour. 

Trampolene's third album Love No Less Than a Queen was released on 3 September 2021 and entered the UK Official Independent Albums Chart at number 5, number 1 in the Independent Breakers Chart, number 12 in the Official Vinyl Chart and number 20 in the Official Album Sales Chart in the UK Official Chart.

Trampolene's debut full-length album Swansea to Hornsey was released on 27 October 2017 and was number 10 on The Independents 30 best albums of 2017 list. They released a 28-track double album compilation of their 2013–2017 Pocket Album EPs entitled Pick a Pocket or Two on 7 September 2018, which entered the UK Official Independent Breakers Chart at number 10.

On 25 February 2022 Trampolene headlined Swansea Arena.

Trampolene returned to Paris to play Supersonic in April 2022 and in May they supported Peter Doherty at London's KOKO, Birmingham Town Hall and Cambridge Junction.

History

2013–2015: Early years 
Trampolene are named after the Julian Cope song "Trampolene". They formed in their hometown of Swansea - Jones and Thomas having met when playing for the Football Association of Wales and Jones knew drummer "Mr Williams" from college.

They moved to a flat in London with the idea of it being a 24/7 creative work factory, like Andy Warhol's Factory, where no internet was allowed, and they invited artists to come round and share ideas and talk about songwriting, poetry, painting and society in general. Jack roadied for Palma Violets and the Strypes in 2013. Although Jack suffers from Crohn's disease resulting in regular hospital appointments for treatment, the band began to play gigs across the country, gaining support from people such as Ray Davies, journalists Pete Paphides and Caitlin Moran, and musicians Carl Barât and Nick Hodgson.

Through mi7 Records they released limited edition 7" singles "My Bourgeoisie Girl/ Under the Strobe Light" and "You Do Nothing For Me/ Adrenaline" in 2013. "Under the Strobe Light" made them online music magazine Louder than War 's New Band of the Day. Following the release of download-only single "I Don't Know" in early 2014, the Guardian called Trampolene "the saviours of indie guitar music". This was followed in April 2014 by their first downloadable "Pocket Album" (5 songs and 1 poem) "Alcohol Kiss" which was also released as a three track limited edition single. They toured throughout the year across the UK and also in France, finishing the year supporting Carl Barât & the Jackals on New Year's Eve at the Macbeth in Hoxton, London.

March 2015 saw the release of "Pocket Album 2" and single "Imagine Something Yesterday", which was a Q Magazine Track of the Day. The video for spoken word "Health & Wellbeing (At Wood Green Job Centre)" was premiered on the Guardian online.

A line-up change in the Spring of 2015 saw Mr Williams leave the band and Jones' childhood friend Rob Steele join as Trampolene's new drummer.

"Pocket Album 3" was released in October 2015, the video for "It's Not Rock & Roll" was premiered on Clash Music website and the single received airplay on Radio X and was played by Greg James and Huw Stephens BBC Radio 1, with the Independent newspaper calling it "new music to listen to this week". The video for their cover of Leonard Cohen's "Tonight Will Be Fine" was premiered on Gigwise on 7 October and "Ketamine" on Noisey on 21 October.

Trampolene recorded a live session for "artists in residence" on John Kennedy's X-Posure show on Radio X and also for Gigwise in November 2015.

Gigs during 2015 included supporting Carl Barât & the Jackals at the Scala, London, headlining James Endeacott's 1965 Records night at the Amersham Arms, in New Cross, a four-week Friday night residency at KOKO in Camden, sets at Glastonbury and Isle of Wight festivals, supporting punk legends Buzzcocks, a headline UK tour for This Feeling in association with XFM and Jack Rocks, the Black Heart in Camden, and finishing in December at Nambucca, on Holloway Road, London, building a loyal following of fans along the way.

The video for poem "Pound Land" was premiered on Gigwise on 18 December.

2016–2017: Release of Swansea to Hornsey 
Trampolene's first gig of 2016 was at Brixton Jamm on 6 February.

Download-only single "Tom Hardy" was This Feeling's Track of the Day on Gigslutz website 28 February 2016.

Trampolene began a UK tour beginning in April 2016, with headline dates across the country throughout the year including KOKO, Nambucca and The Water Rats in London, plus venues across the UK including Manchester, Leeds, Sheffield, York, Swansea, Dundee, Preston, Plymouth and the John Peel Centre for Creative Arts in Stowmarket. They also played the Greenpeace stage at Glastonbury festival for the second year running, and headlined the Jack Rocks This Feeling stage at Leeds Festival. Other festival appearances included Y Not, Kendal Calling and Party in the Pines.

During May 2016, Jack supported Peter Doherty on his "Eudaimonia" UK tour and also played guitar for him. Venues included Glasgow Barrowlands Ballroom, Manchester Albert Hall and two nights at London's Hackney Empire (where Wayne joined him to sing harmony).

Single "The Gangway" was premiered on BBC Radio 1 by Huw Stephens on 29 June 2016, followed by John Kennedy on Radio X on 30 June and subsequently played on various radio stations. The song is featured on Pocket Album Four, which was released on 12 August 2016 and reached the top 20 in digital charts across Europe.

7 September 2016 Jones was asked to perform "To Be a Libertine" and introduce The Libertines to the stage at their sell-out Unity Rocks charity show.

Trampolene's "homecoming" show at The Scene Bar in Swansea on 30 September was reported in the South Wales Evening Post, particularly because a fan travelled from Japan to see them.

Jones recorded an acoustic session for The Selector radio station of The British Council.

"Divided Kingdom" was released as a single on 11 October 2016 and was This Feeling's Track of the Day on Gigslutz website, plus Track/Song of the Day on other online music magazines. It was premiered on BBC Radio One on the Annie Mac show, first played on Radio X by John Kennedy and on BBC Radio Wales by Adam Walton. The video was premiered on Gigwise website.

Pocket Album Five was released on 25 November 2016.

In November 2016, the day after Trampolene headlined a sold-out show for This Feeling (club night) at Water Rats in London, Jones flew to Argentina as Peter Doherty's lead guitarist in his band the Puta Madres, for a November/December 2016 tour of Argentina, France and UK. They played two shows for the reopening of Le Bataclan in Paris, followed by a week's tour across France and shows in London and Manchester. Jack Jones opened the shows with a solo music and spoken word set, before rejoining the stage as Peter's lead guitarist.

The video for "Blue Balls and a Broken Heart" was filmed during a Puta Madres show in Lyon and was premiered on NME on 29 November.

The video for "She's a Nice Girl" was released January 2017 and "Slug" on 4 February.

In January 2017 Trampolene began a series of "House Party" gigs, playing in fans' houses. They made the Welsh newspapers after playing in a young fan's garage.

Trampolene played four dates in Scotland, 28 February and 1–3 March 2017, then Paris on 25 March at La Mecanique, plus a secret show at Le Tigre. Shows in Spring included Sioux club in Ghent, Belgium and a charity gig fundraising for Crohn's & Colitis UK in Swindon; Cardiff, Leeds and The Great Escape Festival in Brighton. 2017 shows included a headline tour across the UK, a series of summer festival dates including Isle of Wight and Reading, in association with This Feeling and Jack Rocks, two shows supporting The Libertines in September, and five dates supporting Liam Gallagher on his UK arena tour in December.

The Beautiful Pain EP was released on 7 July, along with videos for the title track and "Saving My Life in A&E", both filmed and directed by Roger Sargent, which were premiered on Gigwise.

Trampolene's debut album Swansea to Hornsey was released on 27 October 2017 and was included in The Independent newspaper's 30 best albums of 2017. It caused controversy when Facebook threatened to delete the band's account, as the album cover features a childhood nude photograph of Jack and his sister.

Trampolene toured the UK during November 2017, known as the Hi-Vis Tour with Jack wearing a hi-vis jacket on stage every night.

They supported Liam Gallagher on his arena tour in December 2017.

2018–2019 
The single "Hard Times For Dreamers" was released in March 2018, premiered by Phil Taggart on BBC Radio One on 19 March 2018 and was made Track of the Day on several music blogs.

The band recorded a live session at BBC Maida Vale studio which was broadcast on Huw Stephens show on Radio One 26 and 27 March.

In the Spring of 2018 they toured the UK, ending with their biggest headline show to date at Scala, London. The band headlined the BBC Music Introducing stage at BBC Biggest Weekend festival in Swansea in May, in June they supported Liam Gallagher at Finsbury Park, London and Kasabian in Bristol. They played several festivals throughout the summer including Kendal Calling, Truck, Victorious and Wheels and Fins.

In July 2018 they recorded a session for Radio X.

They released a 28=track double album compilation of their 2013–2017 Pocket Album EPs entitled Pick a Pocket or Two on 7 September 2018, which entered the UK Official Independent Breakers Chart at number 10.

They released the single "The One Who Loves You" in October 2018.

In October 2018 they supported The Sherlocks on tour across the UK, before their own headline tour in November which included Dingwalls in London and Clwb Ifor Bach in Cardiff.

In January 2019 they appeared on Soccer AM on British Sky television.

Their first live show of 2019 was an Mi7 Records label night at Dublin Castle on 5 June.

On 29 September 2019 it was announced on Trampolene's social media that drummer Rob Steele and the band had parted ways.

2019–2021 
Jay Bone joined the band as their new drummer, he previously met them whilst drumming for Carl Barat.

In November 2019 Trampolene supported Liam Gallagher at Cardiff Motorpoint Arena and in December 2019 they supported The Libertines on four dates of their UK tour.

They supported The Sherlocks in March 2020 at Camden's Electric Ballroom and Cardiff Tramshed.

In April 2020 Trampolene's albums were featured on Twitter listening parties organised by Tim Burgess under the name "Tim's Twitter Listening Party".

In May 2020 during COVID-19 lockdown, Trampolene and Peter Doherty recorded and released the single "Uncle Brian's Abattoir" to download and stream, with accompanying video filmed in Swansea and Normandy which was premiered on NMEs website.

In February 2021 NME premiered Trampolene's video for the spoken word poem "Come Join Me in Life".

The single "Oh Lover" was released 12 March 2021, along with news of Trampolene signing to Doherty's new record label Strap Originals.

On 12 April 2021 the video for "Gotta Do More Gotta Be More", the third in a sequence filmed and directed by Roger Sargent, was released.

The video and single "Shoot the Lights" was released on 24 June 2021.

Trampolene played shows in August 2021 at Deaf Institute Manchester, The Globe Cardiff and Moth Club in London.

Trampolene's album Love No Less Than a Queen was released on 3 September 2021 and entered the UK Official Independent Albums Chart at number 5, number 1 in the Independent Breakers Chart, number 12 in the Official Vinyl Chart and number 20 in the Official Album Sales Chart in the UK Official Chart.

The band played a series of instore gigs and record signings the week following the release of Love No Less Than a Queen, at Rough Trade Bristol, Banquet in Kingston, Jacaranda in Liverpool and Vinyl Whistle in Leeds.

In December 2021 Trampolene supported The Libertines at Manchester Academy and The Forum, Kentish Town.

2022 
Jay Bone left the band and Kyle "Mr" Williams, Trampolene's original drummer, re-joined.

The first show of 2022, and Mr Williams' return as Trampolene drummer was supporting The Libertines at the Great Hall, Cardiff University on 19 February.

On 25 February Trampolene headlined the new Swansea Arena.

Trampolene returned to Paris to play Supersonic in April 2022 and in May they supported Peter Doherty at London's KOKO, Birmingham Town Hall and Cambridge Junction.

In July 2022 Trampolene played Tim Peaks Diner stage at Kendal Calling festival.

The single "Thinking Again" was released on 13 October.

In October, Trampolene were main support for The Libertines for five shows on their European tour, playing in Brussels, Paris, Cologne, Hamburg and Drammen.

On 4 November they were main support for Jamie Webster at the Great Hall, Cardiff.

Trampolene made their second appearance on Sky Sports Soccer AM on 26 November 2022.

2023 
Single "Money" was released 19 January 2023.

Musical style 
Trampolene are an alternative rock or indie rock band, with influences as diverse as The Prodigy, Oasis and Dylan Thomas.

They are described in the media as having "raw, unpolished talent...backed by squealing guitar riffs", "supercharged indie rock" with "tons of attitude and loads of melody".

Gigwise have called them "the perfect package", The Gig Channel say "Trampolene combines poetry and rock'n'roll perfectly" and This Feeling say they "do not fail to deliver with their unique combo of garage rock, kitchen-sink poetry and acoustic heartbreakers." Music website Gigslutz adding "the raw combination of the spoken word united with a weightier expression of rock rhythm symbolised This Feeling’s manifestation of exciting new talent".

Discography 

 "You Do Nothing For Me" / "Adrenaline" 7" and digital download Released 12 August 2013
 "My Bourgeoisie Girl" / "Under The Strobe Light" 7" and digital download with bonus songs "Very Thin" / "Swansea To Hornsey" released 25 November 2013
 "I Don't Know" free download released 3 February 2014
 POCKET ALBUM ONE Released 28 April 2014: Alcohol Kiss / Pack of Bastards / Camden Mannequins 7" and digital download including bonus songs "Foolish & Hungry" / "Red Sky Sings" / "Artwork of Youth."
 "Newcastle Brown (Love Song)" free download released 3 November 2014
 POCKET ALBUM TWO Released 16 March 2015: "Imagine Something Yesterday" / "I’m On My Own" / "Cinderella’s Shoe" / "Newcastle Brown Love Song" / "Health & Wellbeing (At Wood Green Job Centre)"
 POCKET ALBUM THREE Released 2 October 2015: "It’s Not Rock & Roll" / "Concept Lover" / "Ketamine" / "Tonight will Be Fine" / "No One’s Got Love Like We Got"
 "Pound Land" free download released 11 December 2015
 "Tom Hardy" free download released 26 February 2016
 "The Gangway" released 1 July 2016 
 POCKET ALBUM FOUR Released 12 August 2016: "The Gangway" / "Tom Hardy" / "Friday I'm In Love" / "Letting You Down" / "To Be A Libertine"
 "Divided Kingdom" released 11 October 2016
 POCKET ALBUM FIVE Released 25 November 2016: "Divided Kingdom" / "Dreams So Rich, Life So Poor" / "Blue Balls & A Broken Heart" / "Slug" / "She's A Nice Girl"
 BEAUTIFUL PAIN EP Released 7 July 2017: "Beautiful Pain" / "She Sits With Me" / "Saving My Life in A&E" / "Please Please Please"
 "SWANSEA TO HORNSEY" Trampolene's debut album released 27 October 2017
 "Hard Times For Dreamers" released March 2018
"PICK A POCKET OR TWO" 28 track double album released 7 September 2018
"The One Who Loves You" released October 2018
"Uncle Brian's Abattoir" Trampolene featuring Peter Doherty released May 2020
"Come Join Me in Life" digitally released 26 February 2021
"Oh Lover" released 13 March 2021
"Gotta Do More Gotta Be More" released 12 April 2021
"Shoot the Lights" released 24 June 2021
"LOVE NO LESS THAN A QUEEN" album released 3 September 2021
"RULES OF LOVE & WAR" album to be released 17 March 2023

References

External links 
 Official website

Welsh indie rock groups
Musical groups from Swansea
Musical groups established in 2013
British musical trios